Bioclaustration is kind of interaction when one organism (usually soft bodied) is embedded in a living substrate (i.e. skeleton of another organism); it means “biologically walled -up”.  In case of symbiosis the walling-up is not complete and both organisms stay alive (Palmer and Wilson, 1988).

References

 
 

Ecology
Ecology terminology
Symbiosis
Trace fossils